The Carrefour-de-l'Hôpital District (English: Crossroads of the Hospital) (District 13) is a municipal district in the city of Gatineau, Quebec. It is represented on Gatineau City Council by Olive Kamanyana.

The district is located in the Gatineau sector of the city. The district was created in 2009 from parts of Promenades District and Versant District. It consists of the neighbourhoods of Du Barry and Le Carrefour and the area around Parc Henri-Durant.

Councillors
Patsy Bouthillette (2009–2013)
Gilles Carpentier (2013–2021)
Olive Kamanyana (2021–present)

Election results

2021

2017

2013

2009

Districts of Gatineau